Erechthias darwini is a moth of the family Tineidae. It is endemic to St. Paul’s Rocks, a group of 15 small islets and rocks in the central equatorial Atlantic Ocean. It was first recorded by Charles Darwin.

The length of the forewings is about 6 mm. Adults are small and brown.

The larvae have been collected from seabird nests where they probably feed on seaweed.

References

Moths described in 1983
Erechthiinae